Nowjeh Deh-ye Sofla (also Romanized as Nowjeh Deh-ye Soflá; also known as Nowjeh Deh-ye Shojā‘ān, Nowjeh Deh Shoja’eyan, Nowjeh Deh-ye Pā’īn, Nowjeh Deh-ye Shojā‘ī, Nowjeh Deh-ye Shojā‘īān, Nowjeh Deh-ye Sojā’ī, and Nūjeh Deh-e Shojā‘īān) is a village in Misheh Pareh Rural District, in the Central District of Kaleybar County, East Azerbaijan Province, Iran. At the 2006 census, its population was 146, in 43 families.

References 

Populated places in Kaleybar County